This article contains the discography of Finnish singer and songwriter Olavi Uusivirta and includes information relating to his album and single releases.

Albums

Live albums

Compilation albums

Singles

References

Pop music discographies
Discographies of Finnish artists